KHF Shqiponja  is a women's handball club from Gjakova in western Kosovo. KHF Shqiponja competes in the SuperLiga e femrave e Kosoves and the Kosovo Handball Women's Cup.

European record

Team

Current squad 

Squad for the 2016–17 season

Goalkeepers
 Xhylshahe Bajramaj
 Andjela Pjescic 
 Valbona Rudaku

Wingers
RW
  Dafina Gashi
  Mane Ibrahimi
  Donika Karaqi
LW 
  Albulena Basha
  Valerina Malaj
Line players 
  Mergime Aliqkaj
  Fitore Berisha
  Donjeta Cekaj
  Blerina Haxha
  Erolinda Kuqi
  Shkurte Mehmeti

Back players
LB
  Xhevahire Bajramaj 
  Edonjeta Mustafa
  Ramize Rexhepi
CB 
  Belma Beba
  Alma Nivokazi 
  Shqipe Tahiri 
RB
  Shpresa Fazlija
  Albulena Kelmendi
  Ernesa Mustafa

External links

 
 EHF Club profile

Kosovar handball clubs
Sport in Gjakova